Bongaigaon Municipal Board is a municipal board in India, a section of the country's local government.

Creation

During 1989, the Government of Assam took the decision to create a new district Bongaigaon, carving out some areas of Goalpara and Kokrajhar districts with its headquarters located at Bongaigaon. On 29 September 1989, the creation of Bongaigaon district was declared by the Government of Assam.

Geography
It has an average elevation of 54 metres (177 feet).

Population
As of 2011 India census, Bongaigaon Urban Agglomeration (UA) had a population of 1,09,810. Hinduism is the major religion in the town. Bongaigaon has an average literacy rate of 70.44%.with male literacy of 75.48% and female literacy of 65.18%.

Most of the residents are engaged in agriculture and a minority in service sector.

References

Bongaigaon
Local government in Assam